Vidya Rafika Rahmatan Toyyiba (born 27 May 2001) is an Indonesian rifle shooter. She won two gold medal at the 2019 Southeast Asian Games in the Philippines. She was the first Indonesian shooter to qualify for the now postponed 2020 Summer Olympics in Tokyo.

References

External links

2001 births
Living people
People from Depok
Indonesian female sport shooters
Shooters at the 2020 Summer Olympics
Olympic shooters of Indonesia
Shooters at the 2018 Asian Games
Asian Games competitors for Indonesia
Competitors at the 2019 Southeast Asian Games
Southeast Asian Games gold medalists for Indonesia
Southeast Asian Games medalists in shooting
21st-century Indonesian women